Igor Ivanovich Boev (born 22 November 1989) is a Russian professional racing cyclist, who currently rides for UCI ProTeam .

Major results

2010
 10th Grand Prix of Donetsk
2011
 2nd Overall Baltic Chain Tour
 9th Memorial Oleg Dyachenko
2012
 1st Overall Five Rings of Moscow
1st Stage 3
 1st Grand Prix de la ville de Nogent-sur-Oise
 1st Mayor Cup
 1st Stage 2 Tour du Loir-et-Cher
 1st Stage 3 (TTT) Circuit des Ardennes
 3rd La Roue Tourangelle
2014
 Grand Prix of Adygeya
1st Points classification
1st Stages 2 & 5
 Five Rings of Moscow
1st Points classification
1st Stages 2 & 4
 Tour of Kavkaz
1st  Mountains classification
1st Stage 2
 2nd Memorial Oleg Dyachenko
2016
 6th Gran Premio della Costa Etruschi
 7th Grote Prijs Stad Zottegem
2017
 5th Road race, National Road Championships

References

External links

1989 births
Living people
Russian male cyclists
Sportspeople from Voronezh